Henry John Chaytor (1871–1954), British academic, classicist and hispanist, was Master of St Catharine's College, Cambridge from 1933 to 1946.

Biography 

After teaching at Merchant Taylors', Crosby, Chaytor was appointed second master at King Edward VII School, Sheffield in 1905; in 1908 he left Sheffield to become headmaster of Plymouth College. In 1919 he took up a Fellowship at St Catharine's College, Cambridge and became Master in 1933.

References

External links
 
 

1871 births
1954 deaths
Masters of St Catharine's College, Cambridge
British classical scholars
British Hispanists